Dominical letters or Sunday letters are a method used to determine the day of the week for particular dates. When using this method, each year is assigned a letter (or pair of letters for leap years) depending on which day of the week the year starts.

Dominical letters are derived from the Roman practice of marking the repeating sequence of eight letters A–H (commencing with A on January 1) on stone calendars to indicate each day's position in the eight-day market week (nundinae). The word is derived from the number nine due to their practice of inclusive counting. After the introduction of Christianity a similar sequence of seven letters A–G was added alongside, again commencing with January 1. The dominical letter marks the Sundays. Nowadays they are used primarily as part of the computus, which is the method of calculating the date of Easter.

A common year is assigned a single dominical letter, indicating which lettered days are Sundays in that particular year (hence the name, from Latin dominica for Sunday). Thus, 2023 is A, indicating that all A days are Sunday, and by inference, January 1, 2023, is a Sunday. Leap years are given two letters, the first valid for January 1 – February 28 (or February 24, see below), the second for the remainder of the year.

In leap years, the leap day may or may not have a letter. In the Catholic version it does, but in the 1662 and subsequent Anglican versions it does not. The Catholic version causes February to have 29 days by doubling the sixth day before March 1, inclusive, thus both halves of the doubled day have a dominical letter of F. The Anglican version adds a day to February that did not exist in common years, February 29, thus it does not have a dominical letter of its own. After the 1662 reform there was correspondence between the Archbishop of Canterbury and the printer of the Book of Common Prayer, in which it was explained that the feast day of St Matthias now fell on February 24 every year.

In either case, all other dates have the same dominical letter every year, but the days of the dominical letters change within a leap year before and after the intercalary day, February 24 or February 29.

History and arrangement 
According to  dominical letters are:

Another one is "Add G, beg C, fad F," and yet another is "At Dover dwell George Brown, Esquire; Good Christopher Finch; and David Fryer."

Dominical letter cycle 

If the letter of the first day of a month is the dominical letter of the year, the month will have a Friday the 13th. That is to say, if the first day is Sunday, the 13th day will be Friday.

 continues: 

Of course, "24 February" is not "counted twice". The 23rd is ante diem vii kalendas Martias, the next day in a leap year is a.d. bis sextum kal. Mart., the next day is the regular a.d.vi kal. Mart., and so to the end of the month. For example, in 2020 (=ED), all days preceding the leap day will correspond to a common-year E calendar, and all days afterward will correspond to a common-year D calendar. The relevant line of the Februarius page in the Kalendarium of a 1913 Breviarium Romanum reads:

5 |f|vj|24|S. MATHIAE APOSTOLI, dupl. 2. class.

The first column is the epact, a replacement for the golden number, from which the age of the moon was computed and announced in some English cathedrals prior to the Reformation. The second column is the letter, the third the Roman date and the fourth the modern date. A note at the foot of the page reads:

In anno bissextili mensis Februarius est dierum 29. et Festum S. Mathiae celebratur die 25. Februarii et bis dicitur sexto Kalendas, id est die 24. et die 25. et littera Dominicalis, quae assumpta fuit in mense Januario, mutatur in praecedentem; ut si in Januario littera Dominicalis fuerit A, mutatur in praecedentem, quae est g. etc.; et littera f bis servit, 24. et 25. 
 
(In a bissextile year the month February is of 29 days and the Feast of St Matthias is celebrated on 25 February, and twice is said on the sixth Kalends, that is on the 24th and 25th, and the Sunday letter, which was assumed in the month of January, is changed to the preceding; so if in January the Sunday letter may have been A, it is changed to the preceding, which is g. etc.; and letter f twice serves, 24th and 25th.)

Dominical letters of the years
The dominical letter of a year provides the link between the date and the day of the week on which it falls. The following are the correspondences between dominical letters and the day of the week on which their corresponding years is day and date:

 A: common year starting on Sunday has two Friday the 13ths in the January and October.
 B: common year starting on Saturday has one Friday the 13th in the May.
 C: common year starting on Friday has one Friday the 13th in the August.
 D: common year starting on Thursday has three Friday the 13ths in the February, March and November.
 E: common year starting on Wednesday has one Friday the 13th in the June.
 F: common year starting on Tuesday has two Friday the 13ths in the September and December.
 G: common year starting on Monday has two Friday the 13ths in the April and July.
.
 AG: leap year starting on Sunday has three Friday the 13ths in the January, April and July.
 BA: leap year starting on Saturday has one Friday the 13th in the October.
 CB: leap year starting on Friday has one Friday the 13th in the May.
 DC: leap year starting on Thursday has two Friday the 13ths in the February and August.
 ED: leap year starting on Wednesday has two Friday the 13ths in the March and November.
 FE: leap year starting on Tuesday has one Friday the 13th in the June.
 GF: leap year starting on Monday has two Friday the 13ths in the September and December.

The Gregorian calendar repeats every 400 years (i. e., every four centuries). Of the 400 years in one Gregorian cycle, there are:
 44 common years for each single Dominical letter D and F;
 43 common years for each single Dominical letter A, B, C, E, and G;
 15 leap years for each double Dominical letter AG and CB;
 14 leap years for each double Dominical letter ED and FE;
 13 leap years for each double Dominical letter BA, DC, and GF.
Thus years which begin as A, C, or F occur 58 times in 400 years, years that begin as D or E 57 times, and those that begin as B or G just 56 times. The end of a year preceding a given year has the next letter (so A years are preceded by years ending as B), so years ending as B, D, or G occur 58 times in 400 years, those ending as E or F 57 times, and those ending as C or A 56 times. This means, for example, that Christmas falls on a Saturday or Monday (C and A years, resp.) 56 times in 400 years, whereas it falls on Friday, Sunday, or Tuesday (D, B, and G years, resp.) 58 times.

The Julian calendar repeats every 28 years. Of the 28 years in one Julian cycle, there are:
 3 common years for each single Dominical letter A, B, C, D, E, F, and G;
 1 leap year for each double Dominical letter BA, CB, DC, ED, FE, GF, and AG.

Calculation

The dominical letter of a year can be calculated based on any method for calculating the day of the week, with letters in reverse order compared to numbers indicating the day of the week.

For example:
ignore periods of 400 years
considering the second letter in the case of a leap year:
for one century within two multiples of 400, go forward two letters from BA for 2000, hence C, E, G.
for remaining years, go back one letter every year, two for leap years (this corresponds to writing two letters, no letter is skipped).
to avoid up to 99 steps within a century, the table below can be used.

Red for the first two months of leap years.

For example, to find the Dominical Letter of the year 1913:

1900 is G and 13 corresponds to 5
G + 5 = G − 2 = E, 1913 is E

Similarly, for 2007:
2000 is BA and 7 corresponds to 6
A + 6 = A − 1 = G, 2007 is G

For 2065:
2000 is BA and 65 mod 28 = 9 corresponds to 3
A + 3 = A − 4 = D, 2065 is D

The odd plus 11 method
A simpler method suitable for finding the year's dominical letter was discovered in 2010. It is called the "odd plus 11" method.

The procedure accumulates a running total T as follows:
 Let T be the year's last two digits.
If T is odd, add 11. 
Let T = .
If T is odd, add 11.
Let T = T mod 7.
Count forward T letters from the century's dominical letter (A, C, E or G see above) to get the year's dominical letter.

The formula is

De Morgan's rule
This rule was stated by Augustus De Morgan:
Add 1 to the given year. 
Take the quotient found by dividing the given year by 4 (neglecting the remainder). 
Take 16 from the centurial figures of the given year if that can be done. 
Take the quotient of III divided by 4 (neglecting the remainder). 
From the sum of I, II and IV, subtract III. 
Find the remainder of V divided by 7: this is the number of the Dominical Letter, supposing A, B, C, D, E, F, G to be equivalent respectively to 6, 5, 4, 3, 2, 1, 0.
So the formulae (using the floor function) for the Gregorian calendar is 

It is equivalent to

and
     (where  = last two digits of the year,  = century part of the year).
For example, to find the Dominical Letter of the year 1913: 
1. (1 + 1913 + 478 + 0 − 3) mod 7 = 2
2. (1913 + 478 + 4 − 19 − 1) mod 7 = 2
3. (13 + 3 + 15 -1) mod 7 = 2

Hence, the Dominical Letter is E in the Gregorian calendar.

De Morgan's rules no. 1 and 2 for the Julian calendar:

 and 

To find the Dominical Letter of the year 1913 in the Julian calendar:

(1913 + 478 − 3) mod 7 = 1

Hence, the Dominical Letter is F in the Julian calendar.

In leap years the formulae above give the Dominical Letter for the last ten months of the year. To find the Dominical Letter for the first two months of the year to the leap day (inclusive) subtract 1 from the calculated number representing the original Dominical Letter; if the new number is less than 0, it must be changed to 6.

Dominical letter in relation to the Doomsday Rule

The "doomsday" concept in the doomsday algorithm is mathematically related to the Dominical letter. Because the letter of a date equals the dominical letter of a year (DL) plus the day of the week (DW), and the letter for the doomsday is C except for the portion of leap years before February 29 in which it is D, we have:

Note: G = 0 = Sunday, A = 1 = Monday, B = 2 = Tuesday, C = 3 = Wednesday, D = 4 = Thursday, E = 5 = Friday, and F = 6 = Saturday, i.e. in our context, C is mathematically identical to 3.

Hence, for instance, the doomsday of the year 2013 is Thursday, so DL = (3–4) mod 7 = 6 = F. The dominical letter of the year 1913 is E, so DW = (3–5) mod 7 = 5 = Friday.

All in one table
If the year of interest is not within the table, use a tabular year which gives the same remainder when divided by 400 (Gregorian calendar) or 700 (Julian calendar). In the case of the Revised Julian calendar, find the date of Easter Sunday (see the section "Calculating Easter Sunday", subsection "Revised Julian calendar" below) and enter it into the "Table of letters for the days of the year" below. If the year is a leap year, the dominical letter for January and February is found by inputting the date of Easter Monday. Note the different rules for leap years:
Gregorian calendar: every year which divides exactly by 4, but of century years only those which divide exactly by 400; therefore ignore the left-hand letter given for a century year which is not a leap year.
Julian calendar: every year which divides exactly by 4.
Revised Julian calendar: every year which divides exactly by 4, but of century years only those which give the remainder 200 or 600 when divided by 900.

Years with special dominical letters
When a country switched to the Gregorian calendar, there could be some unusual combinations of dominical letters.

Some examples 
 1582: Many Catholic countries switched to the Gregorian calendar Friday October 15. The table above indicates that year 1582 had the dominical letter G in the Julian calendar and C in the Gregorian one. So the dominical letters for 1582 in these Catholic countries became GC for mixing the two calendars used in this legal year, a special combination not seen before and after with a single calendar used in the same legal year.
 1752: The British Empire and its colonies switched to the Gregorian calendar Thursday September 14. 1752, a leap year, had in the Julian calendar dominical letters ED and in the Gregorian one dominical letters BA, so the dominical letters for 1752 in Britain were EDA, a very special combination which also only applies to this legal year.

Calculating Easter Sunday 

Enter the "all in one table" to find the date of the paschal full moon, then use the "week table" below to find the day of the week on which it falls. Easter is the following Sunday.

Week table: Julian and Gregorian calendars for AD years since March 1 AD 4 

Note that this table does not work for AD years at the early stage of the real Julian calendar before March 1 AD 4 or for any BC year, except when using the Julian calendar rules for proleptic dates (which are different from effective historic dates, whose effective calendar in use depended on the location of dated events or the location of the person using the calendar, sometimes differently between political/civil or religious purposes in places where both calendars still coexisted). The duration of months, and the number and placement of intercalated days also changed inconsistently before AD 42 in the early local Julian calendars which used native names for the months, depending on places and years, causing finally a lot of confusion in the population (so dating events precisely in that period is often difficult, unless they are correlated with observed lunar cycles, or with days of the week, or with another calendar).

In these early AD years and in all BC years, with the effective Julian calendars used locally to align the counting of years (but still with the tradition inherited from the earlier Roman calendar for noting days in each year), a variable number of days at end of the months (after the last day of its ides but before the last day of calends which started the next month) were also still counted relatively from the start of the next named month (on the last day of its calends), and years were theoretically starting on March 1 (but with the last days of the year in February also counted from the New Year's Day in March). As well, all these early years were effectively counted inclusively and positively from a different, much earlier epoch in other eras, such as the supposed foundation of Rome, or the accession to power of a local ruler (and still not relatively to the supposed date of birth of Christ, which was fixed later arbitrarily by a Christian reform for the modern Julian calendar so that this epoch for the Christian era starts now on January 1 in proleptic year AD 1 of the modern Julian calendar, but the real date of birth of Christ is still not known precisely but certainly falls before, somewhere in the last few BC years).

Instructions

For Julian dates before 1300 and after 1999 the year in the table which differs by an exact multiple of 700 years should be used. For Gregorian dates after 2299, the year in the table which differs by an exact multiple of 400 years should be used. The values "r0" through "r6" indicate the remainder when the Hundreds value is divided by 7 and 4 respectively, indicating how the series extend in either direction. Both Julian and Gregorian values are shown 1500–1999 for convenience.

The corresponding numbers in the far left hand column on the same line as each component of the date (the hundreds, remaining digits and month) and the day of the month are added together. This total is then divided by 7 and the remainder from this division located in the far left hand column. The day of the week is beside it. Bold figures (e.g., 04) denote leap year. If a year ends in 00 and its hundreds are in bold it is a leap year. Thus 19 indicates that 1900 is not a Gregorian leap year, (but bold 19 in the Julian column indicates that it is a Julian leap year, as are all Julian x00 years). 20 indicates that 2000 is a leap year. Use bold Jan and Feb only in leap years.

For determination of the day of the week (January 1, 2000, Saturday)
the day of the month: 1
the month: 6
the year: 0
the century mod 4 for the Gregorian calendar and mod 7 for the Julian calendar 0
adding . Dividing by 7 leaves a remainder of 0, so the day of the week is Saturday.

Revised Julian calendar 

 Use the Julian portion of the table of paschal full moons. Use the "week table" (remembering to use the "Julian" side) to find the day of the week on which the paschal full moon falls. Easter is the following Sunday and it is a Julian date. Call this date JD. 
 Subtract 100 from the year.
 Divide the result by 100. Call the number obtained (omitting fractions) N.
 Evaluate . Call the result (omitting fractions) S.

Example. What is the date of Easter in 2017?

. . Golden number is 4. Date of paschal full moon is April 2 (Julian). From "week table" April 2, 2017 (Julian) is Saturday. . . . . . . .

Calculate the day of the week in the Revised Julian calendar 

Note that the date (and hence the day of the week) in the Revised Julian and Gregorian calendars is the same up until February 28, 2800, and that for large years it may be possible to subtract 6300 or a multiple thereof before starting so as to reach a year within or closer to the table.

To look up the weekday of any date for any year using the table, subtract 100 from the year, divide the number obtained by 100, multiply the resulting quotient (omitting fractions) by seven and divide the product by nine. Note the quotient (omitting fractions). Enter the table with the Julian year, and just before the final division add 50 and subtract the quotient noted above.

Example: What is the day of the week of 27 January 8315?

From the table: for hundreds (13): 6. For remaining digits (15): 4. For month (January): 0. For date (27): 27. . . Day of week = Tuesday.

Dominical letter
To find the dominical letter, calculate the day of the week for either January 1 or October 1. If it is Sunday, the Sunday Letter is A, if Saturday B, and similarly backwards through the week and forwards through the alphabet to Monday, which is G.

Leap years have two letters, so for January and February calculate the day of the week for January 1 and for March to December calculate the day of the week for October 1.

Leap years are all years that divide exactly by four, with the following exceptions:

Gregorian calendar – all years divisible by 100, except those that divide exactly by 400.

Revised Julian calendar – all years divisible by 100, except those with a remainder of 200 or 600 when divided by 900.

Clerical utility

The dominical letter had another practical utility in the period prior to the annual printing of the Ordo divini officii recitandi, in which period, therefore, Christian clergy were often required to determine the Ordo independently. Easter Sunday may be as early as March 22 or as late as April 25, and consequently there are 35 possible days on which it may occur; each dominical letter includes 5 potential dates of these 35, and thus there are 5 possible ecclesiastical calendars for each letter. The Pye or Directorium which preceded the present Ordo took advantage of this principle by delineating all 35 possible calendars and denoting them by the formula "primum A", "secundum A", "tertium A", et cetera. Hence, based on the dominical letter of the year and the epact, the Pye identified the correct calendar to use. A similar table, adapted to the reformed calendar and in more convenient form, is included in the beginning of every breviary and missal under the heading "Tabula Paschalis nova reformata".

Saint Bede does not seem to have been familiar with dominical letters, given his "De temporum ratione"; in its place he adopted a similar device of Greek origin consisting of seven numbers, which he denominated "concurrentes" (De Temp. Rat., Chapter LIII). The "concurrents" are numbers that denote the days of the week on which March 24 occurs in the successive years of the solar cycle, 1 denoting Sunday, 2 (feria secunda) for Monday, 3 for Tuesday, et cetera; these correspond to dominical letters F, E, D, C, B, A, and G, respectively.

Use for computer calculation
Computers are able to calculate the Dominical letter for the first day of a given month in this way (function in C), where:

 m = month
 y = year
 s = "style"; 0 for Julian, otherwise Gregorian.

char dominical(int m, int y, int s) {
  int leap = y % 4 == 0 && (s == 0 || y % 100 != 0 || y % 400 == 0),
      a = (y % 100) % 28,
      b = (s == 0) * (  (y%700)/100 + a/4 * 2  + 4 + ((a%4+1)*!leap + (m+9)/12*leap) * 6 ) % 7
        + (s != 0) * ( ((y%400)/100 + a/4 + 1) * 2 + ((a%4+1)*!leap + (m+9)/12*leap) * 6 ) % 7;
  b += (b == 0) * 7;
  return (char)(b + 64);
}

Years are also given a dominical letter or pair of dominical letters according to the first day in January and last day in December: when they are equal, only the first letter is given. The dominical letter of the last day of December just precedes in the ordered cycle (G,F,E,D,C,B,A), the dominical letter of the first day in January for the next year.

See also
 Determination of the day of the week
 Lectionary#Three-year cycle
 Runic calendar

References

Citations

Sources

Further reading

Easter date
Gregorian calendar
Julian calendar
Latin script
Sunday
Articles with example C code